Poland competed at the 1998 Winter Paralympics in Nagano, Japan. 26 competitors from Poland won 2 medals, both bronze, and finished 21st in the medal table.

Medalists

Bronze
 Danuta Poznańska - Cross-country skiing, Standing 5 km Individual Free ID
 Danuta Poznańska - Cross-country skiing, Standing 15 km Individual Classic ID

Alpine skiing

Biathlon

Cross‑country skiing

See also 
 Poland at the Paralympics
 Poland at the 1998 Winter Olympics

References 

Poland at the Paralympics
1998 in Polish sport
Nations at the 1998 Winter Paralympics